Hannes Paul Schmid (born 19 November 1980 in Bruneck) is an Italian former alpine skier who competed in the 2006 Winter Olympics.

References

External links
 

1980 births
Living people
Italian male alpine skiers
Olympic alpine skiers of Italy
Alpine skiers at the 2006 Winter Olympics
Sportspeople from Bruneck
Germanophone Italian people
Alpine skiers of Centro Sportivo Carabinieri